), is a massif in the southwestern corner of Stora Sjöfallet National Park in northern Sweden.

This peak is the eighth-highest in Sweden. This is the highest vertical drop found in Sweden. Due to the large level differences and the massif being well held together and rather isolated, it looks impressive, earning it the nickname Queen of Lapland. In the Sámi tradition it is a holy mountain, and some hikers regard it with a sense of awe and mystique.

References

Lapland (Sweden)
Mountains of Norrbotten County